The objective of combat assessment is to identify recommendations for the course of military operations.

The determination of the overall effectiveness of force employment during military operations. Combat assessment is composed of three major components:
battle damage assessment (BDA)
munitions effects assessment
reattack recommendation.

The GS-3 is normally the single point of contact for combat assessment at the joint force level, assisted by the joint force GS-2.

Military operations
Military science
Military theory